Somi Falak Naz is a Pakistani politician who has been a member of the Provincial Assembly of Khyber Pakhtunkhwa since August 2018.

Education
She has received intermediate level education.

Political career
She was elected to the Provincial Assembly of Khyber Pakhtunkhwa as a candidate of Pakistan Tehreek-e-Insaf (PTI) on a reserved seat for women in 2018 Pakistani general election.

References

Living people
Pakistan Tehreek-e-Insaf MPAs (Khyber Pakhtunkhwa)
Politicians from Khyber Pakhtunkhwa
Women members of the Provincial Assembly of Khyber Pakhtunkhwa
Year of birth missing (living people)